Anales de la Universidad de Chile is a biannual peer-reviewed academic journal containing research and critical reflections on arts, humanities, and science. It was established in 1843 and is published by the University of Chile. The editor-in-chief is Jennifer Abate Cruces (University of Chile).

External links

Latin American studies journals
Publications established in 1843
University of Chile academic journals
Spanish-language journals
1943 establishments in Chile
Biannual journals